This is a list of newspapers published in Western Australia.

Major titles

See also
 Gascoyne newspapers
 Goldfields-Esperance newspapers
 Great Southern newspapers
 Kimberley newspapers
 Mid West newspapers
 Pilbara newspapers
 South West newspapers
 Wheatbelt newspapers
 List of non-English-language newspapers in Western Australia

References

Further reading
 
 Droppert, Gerard J. (1955) The beginnings of the press in Western Australia : a study of newspapers published during the period 1829-1850  Typescript (photocopy) "HS/PR/1292." held in Battye Library
 
 

 
 
Newspapers